Ewarton is a town in the parish of Saint Catherine, Jamaica.

History
The name is most likely a compound of the surname "Ewart" and the suffix -ton, meaning town.

The town's economy prospered particularly from 1957 when ALCAN established a bauxite plant nearby. The plant was later transferred to WINDALCO and was closed in early 2009 due to a fall in demand for aluminium as a result of the global recession.

Amenities
Caldo Tours

Schools
Ewarton High
Ewarton Primary
Polly Ground Primary
Orangefield Primary

Churches
There are ten churches: 

 Seventh-day Adventist
 Anglican
 Baptist
 Church of Christ
 Church of God of Prophecy
 Gospel Hall
 Gospel Lighthouse
 King's Chapel
 Methodist
 Roman Catholic (St. Catherine of Sienna)

Other
There is a police station, a market which was recently reopened following a three-year closure for refurbishment, and a post office. There is no library, but a Bookmobile visits regularly.

Transport

Road
Ewarton is on the A1 road (Kingston - Lucea), which climbs up from Spanish Town and Bog Walk in the south, enters the town from the south east, passes through the town's central square and continues north towards Moneague and Saint Ann's Bay. The central square is also the town's transport hub from which ply taxis and buses.

Rail
From 1885 to 1947 Ewarton railway station was the terminus of a 14-mile railway branch line from Spanish Town.
In 1947 the section of the line from Linstead to Ewarton was deemed unprofitable and closed.

See also
Roads in Jamaica
Railways of Jamaica: Spanish Town to Ewarton

References
Inline

General
 Ewarton, Saint Catherine, Jamaica

Populated places in Saint Catherine Parish